The United States' Venus Williams defeated Russia's Elena Dementieva in the final, 6–2, 6–4 to win the gold medal in Women's Singles tennis at the 2000 Summer Olympics. In the bronze medal match, the United States' Monica Seles defeated Australia's Jelena Dokic, 6–1, 6–4. Williams' victory was the third consecutive gold medal in the women's singles for the United States, all by different players (preceded by Jennifer Capriati and Lindsay Davenport).

The tournament was held at the Sydney Olympic Park Tennis Centre in Sydney, Australia from 19 September until 28 September. There were 64 competitors from 33 nations, with each nation having up to 3 players.

The United States' Davenport was the reigning gold medalist from 1996, but she withdrew from her second round match due to injury.

Background
This was the ninth appearance of the women's singles tennis. A women's event was held only once during the first three Games (only men's tennis was played in 1896 and 1904), but has been held at every Olympics for which there was a tennis tournament since 1908. Tennis was not a medal sport from 1928 to 1984, though there were demonstration events in 1968 and 1984.

Returning from the 1996 Games were gold medalist Lindsay Davenport of the United States, silver medalist (and 1992 bronze medalist) Arantxa Sánchez Vicario of Spain, and three of the four quarterfinal losers (Conchita Martínez of Spain, Iva Majoli of Croatia, and Monica Seles of the United States). Davenport and Seles were joined by Venus Williams, in the middle of a 35-match and 6-tournament winning streak, as the top 3 seeds in the tournament. Sánchez Vicario and Martínez were 4th and 5th; Spain and the United States were favourites.

Colombia, Haiti, Paraguay, Slovenia, Thailand, Uzbekistan, and Venezuela each made their debut in the event. France made its eighth appearance, most among nations to that point, having missed only the 1908 Games in London (when only British players competed).

Competition format
The competition was a single-elimination tournament with a bronze medal match. Matches were all best-of-three sets. The 12-point tie-breaker was used in any set, except the third, that reached 6–6.

Schedule
All times are Australian Eastern Standard Time (UTC+10)

Seeds

Competitors

Draw

Key

 INV = Tripartite invitation
 IP = ITF place
 Alt = Alternate
 r = Retired
 w/o = Walkover

Finals

Top half

Section 1

Section 2

Bottom half

Section 3

Section 4

References

Drawsheet from the ITF Olympic site

Women's singles
2000 in women's tennis
Women's events at the 2000 Summer Olympics